Marienthal Abbey was a Franziscan monastery in the Westerwald in the present-day county of Altenkirchen in the German state of Rhineland-Palatinate. Today Marienthal is a village in the municipality of Seelbach bei Hamm (Sieg). On 30 June 2011 it had a population of 55.

Literature 
 Andachtsbüchlein für Pilger zum Gnadenort Marienthal nebst einer gedrängten Geschichte der Kirche des Klosters u. des Gnadenbildes : Maria, du schmerzhafte Mutter, ... bitt für uns! ; mit e. Stahlstich. - Linz a. Rh. : Krumscheid, nicht vor 1853. digitalised publication of the University and State Library Düsseldorf
 Jakob Wirtz: Fünfhundert Jahre Marienthal bei Hamm an der Sieg. 2nd edition, Werl, 1928.
 Gabriel Busch (ed.): Hilgenroth/Marienthal. Zwei Wallfahrtsorte, Siegburg, 1982.
 Daniel Schneider: Die Entwicklung der Konfessionen in der Grafschaft Sayn im Grundriss, in: Heimat-Jahrbuch des Kreises Altenkirchen 58 (2015), pp. 74–80.
 Daniel Schneider: Die Geschichte der Ortsgemeinde Obererbach (Westerwald). Die Ortschaften Hacksen, Niedererbach, Obererbach und Koberstein vom Mittelalter bis zur Gegenwart. Obererbach, 2009,  (2 Bände, mit zahlreichen Bezügen zu Marienthal).

Weblinks 

 Klostergastronomie Marienthal

References 

Franciscan monasteries in Germany
17th century in religion
17th-century establishments in the Holy Roman Empire
Catholic pilgrimage sites
Buildings and structures in Altenkirchen (district)
History of Catholicism in Germany
Order of Friars Minor